The Mayor of Mumbai is the elected chief of the Municipal Corporation of Greater Mumbai. The mayor is the first citizen of the city. The role is largely ceremonial as the real powers are vested in the Municipal Commissioner. The Mayor plays a decorative role of representing and upholding the dignity of the city and a functional role in deliberating over the discussions in the corporation.

History of the office 
The designation of the President of the Municipal Corporation of Mumbai was changed into that of His Lordrship the 'Mayor', Mumbai Municipal Corporation from November 1931. 

The precursor to the designation of Mayor were President(1887-1931) and Chairman(1873-1887).

Election of the mayor 
The mayor is elected from within the ranks of the council in a quinquennial election. The elections are conducted in all 227 wards in the city to elect corporators. The party that wins the maximum number of seats holds an internal voting to decide the mayor. If no party or coalition can garner majority to select a mayor from amongst themselves for more than 1 month after general municipality elections or if the office of mayor becomes vacant for any reason mid term and still remains vacant for more than 2 months due to the first said reason, then a general election is held within the municipality for people to directly elect an executive mayor, to serve till end of term of the municipal house.

The tenure of the mayor is 2.5 years or till dissolution of municipal corporation, either by themselves or by state law.

Mayors of BMC

See also
 Mayors of Indian Cities
 Municipal Corporation of Greater Mumbai(MCGM) or Brihanmumbai Municipal Corporation (BMC)
 Municipal Corporation Building, Mumbai (for details on the buildings architecture)
 Coat of arms of Mumbai
 Administrative divisions of Mumbai
 Municipal Commissioner of Mumbai
 Sheriff of Mumbai

References

 Official List of Mayors of Bombay - http://www.mcgm.gov.in/irj/portal/anonymous/qllisthistory

External links
 Municipal Corporation of Greater Mumbai

Brihanmumbai Municipal Corporation

Mumbai
Mumbai-related lists